Goniotipula is a genus of true crane fly.

Distribution
The Goniotipula is only found in South Africa.

Species
G. cuneipennis Alexander, 1921
G. lindneri Mannheims, 1961

References

Tipulidae
Diptera of Africa